Solomon Weaver House is a historic home located at Jerusalem in Yates County, New York. It is an Italianate style dwelling built about 1844.

It was listed on the National Register of Historic Places in 1994.

References

Houses on the National Register of Historic Places in New York (state)
Italianate architecture in New York (state)
Houses completed in 1844
Houses in Yates County, New York
National Register of Historic Places in Yates County, New York